This article lists the winners and nominees for the Black Reel Award for Television for Outstanding Guest Actress, Comedy Series. 
The category was first introduced as Outstanding Guest Performer, Comedy Series, honoring both actors and actresses in guest starring roles on television. In 2018, the category was split into categories for each gender, resulting in the name change to its current title.

Winners and nominees
Winners are listed first and highlighted in bold.

2010s

2020s

Superlatives

Programs with multiple awards

Performers with multiple awards

Programs with multiple nominations

4 nominations 
 black-ish

3 nominations
 Saturday Night Live

2 nominations
 A Black Lady Sketch Show
 Dear White People
 The Good Place

Performers with multiple nominations

3 nominations
 Maya Rudolph

2 nominations
 Angela Bassett
 Rashida Jones
 Regina King
 Anna Deavere Smith

Total awards by network
 NBC - 2
 ABC - 1
 Starz - 1

References

Black Reel Awards